The Department of Primary Industry was an Australian government department that existed between January 1956 and June 1974.

Scope
Information about the department's functions and/or government funding allocation could be found in the Administrative Arrangements Orders, the annual Portfolio Budget Statements and in the department's annual reports.

At the department's creation the department was responsible for the administration of Commonwealth policy on agricultural production, including responsibility
for export inspection services, fisheries development and whaling.

Among other things, the department was tasked with developing price stabilization and marketing plans for many agricultural commodities, including wheat.

Structure
The department was an Australian Public Service department, staffed by officials who were responsible to the Minister for Primary Industry.

References

Primary Industry
Ministries established in 1956
Department of Agriculture, Fisheries and Forestry